Alma Delia Susana Fuentes González (22 January 1937 – 2 April 2017) was a Mexican actress of film, television, and theatre.

Career
Fuentes began her career as a child actress. In 1951, she was nominated for an Ariel Award for Best Youth Performance for her role in Luis Buñuel's Los Olvidados. In the 1960s, Fuentes debuted in television and also starred in films as the leading lady of such popular performers as Cantinflas, Demetrio González, Antonio Aguilar, Eulalio González "Piporro", and Viruta y Capulina.

Filmography

Symphony of Life (1946)
The Flesh Commands (1948)
A Family Like Many Others (1949)
Los olvidados (1950)
If I Were Just Anyone (1950)
Full Speed Ahead (1951)
Las tres perfectas casadas (1953)
Canción de cuna (1953)
The Extra (1962)
Los cuatro Juanes (1966)
La cigüeña distraída (1966)
Lauro Puñales (1969)

References

External links

1937 births
2017 deaths
Mexican film actresses
Mexican television actresses
Mexican stage actresses
Actresses from Mexico City
Mexican child actresses
20th-century Mexican actresses